De Zwethheul is a defunct restaurant located in Zweth, Netherlands. It was a fine dining restaurant that was awarded one Michelin star in the period 1990-2004 and two Michelin stars in the period 2005–2014. De restaurant closed on 8 January 2015 and was replaced by restaurant "Aan de Zweth".

Last head chef was Mario Ridder, who took over in 2006 from Erik van Loo. Cees Wildschut earned the first ever star for the restaurant.

See also
List of Michelin starred restaurants in the Netherlands

Sources and references 

Restaurants in the Netherlands
Michelin Guide starred restaurants in the Netherlands